EliteXC: Street Certified was a mixed martial arts event promoted by EliteXC that took place on Saturday, February 16, 2008, at the BankUnited Center in Miami, Florida.

Background
The main card aired live on Showtime at 10p.m. EST, while the preliminary card streamed on Proelite.com.

The main event featured the return of Kevin "Kimbo Slice" Ferguson as he took on UFC veteran David "Tank" Abbott, a match originally scheduled for October 2007 in Cage Fury Fighting Championships.

The event drew an estimated 522,000 viewers on Showtime.

Results

See also 
 Elite Xtreme Combat
 2008 in Elite Xtreme Combat

External links
Official EliteXC site
Official Showtime Networks, Inc. site for EliteXC: Street Certified

References

Street Certified
Events in Miami
2008 in mixed martial arts
Mixed martial arts in Florida
Sports in Miami
2008 in sports in Florida